Amphipsylla is a genus of fleas belonging to the family Leptopsyllidae.

The genus was first described by Wagner in 1909.

The species of this genus are found in Eurasia and Northern America.

Species:
 Amphipsylla rossica Wagner, 1912

References

Fleas
Siphonaptera genera